Ullco Colla, the lord of Tumipampa was an Incan nobleman who supported the cause of Huáscar in the Inca Civil War. He commanded forces resisting Atahualpa in the north, defecting to the side of the Huáscarans and the central government in Cuzco, but was killed fighting at Chimborazo. His city was seized by the north and was spared, however, as the royal tassel was surrendered to Atahualpa.

1531 deaths
Warriors of Central and South America
Year of birth missing
Inca Empire people
Indigenous leaders of the Americas

Nobility of the Americas